The Norwegian Golf Federation (NGF) is the governing body for the sport of golf in Norway.

The NGF was founded in 1948 after an initiative from Bergen GK, Høsbjør GK, Borregaard GK and Oslo GK. It organizes around 100,000 memberships, making it the fifth largest federation in Norwegian sports. Members are spread across around 180 golf clubs, and as of 2020 all Norwegian golf clubs but one were organized by the NGF.

The NGF manages the national golf teams, the national golf championships, and maintains the Rules of Golf in Norwegian. NGF is a member of the European Golf Association (EGA).

Championships
The NGF organizes the following amateur championships for men and women (eligible age in brackets):
Norwegian Championship (16+)
Norwegian Matchplay Championship (16+)
Norwegian Youth Championship (16–19)
Norwegian Youth Matchplay Championship (16–19)
Norwegian Junior Championship (13–15)
Norwegian Junior Matchplay Championship (13–15)
Norwegian Mid-Amateur Championship (30+)
Norwegian Senior Championship (50+)
Norwegian Team Championship (13+)
Norwegian Junior Team Championship (13–19)
Source:

Notable members

See also

Norsk Golf – magazine distributed to the members of the Norwegian Golf Federation
Norwegian Open – the leading men's professional golf tournament in Norway
Ladies Norwegian Open – the leading women's professional golf tournament in Norway

References

External links
 www.golfforbundet.no/en/, official site

Norway
Golf associations
Golf
Golf in Norway
1948 establishments in Norway
Sports organizations established in 1948